Joseph J. "Joe" MacBrien (20 February 1925 – 18 November 2018) was a Canadian sailor who competed in the 1964 Summer Olympics. He was born in Toronto.

References

1925 births
2018 deaths
Sportspeople from Toronto
Canadian male sailors (sport)
Olympic sailors of Canada
Sailors at the 1964 Summer Olympics – Dragon